Veitsch Mount of Olives Pilgrims Cross, is the world's largest pilgrims cross. It is situated near Veitsch in Austria.

The cross is accessible for visitors.

External links
 http://www.pilgerkreuz.at/

See also
 List of towers

Buildings and structures in Styria
Tourist attractions in Styria
Monumental crosses
2004 establishments in Austria
21st-century architecture in Austria